The Sto. Tomas Integrated High School (STIHS) (Filipino: Mataas na Paaralan ng Sto. Tomas) is a public secondary school in the Municipality of Calauan located in Southville7, NHA Site 3, Brgy. Santo Tomas.

History
Sto. Tomas Integrated High School was first known as Calauan Stand-alone Senior High School and later Calauan Senior High School, established in school year 2016–2017. It offers Technical-Vocational-Livelihood (TVL) Track in Grade 11 and 12, to wit: Home Economics Combo 1 Strand (Front Office Services NC II, Attractions and Theme Parks NC II, Tourism Promotion Services NC II, and Local Guiding Services NC II), Home Economics Combo 2 Strand (Cookery NC II, Bread and Pastry Production NC II, and Food and Beverage Services NC II), and Information Communications Technology Strand (Computer Systems Servicing NC II).

The following school year 2017–2018, it was integrated and became known as Sto. Tomas Integrated High School and offered complete basic secondary education by adding Junior High School (Grade 7 to 10). Thereby, it held its first Moving-Up Ceremonies in Grade 10 and its first Commencement Exercises in Grade 12 this year.

The population of the school has grown ever since, from an initial enrolment of 93 SHS students in SY 2016–2017, it rose to a total of 989 students in SY 2017–2018 and 1,256 students in SY 2018–2019. Thus, from a pioneer of 11 senior high school faculty in the first two school years, it employed an additional 26 junior high school teachers in 2018. This normalized the teacher-student ratio per classroom and distribution of teaching load.

Rhodora C. Alcantara was assigned as the very first school head with the rank of Principal II. She led the school in transition from simply a senior high school to a fully-grown integrated high school. Later on, Marvin A. Umali served as Assistant Principal II to assist in the day-to-day operation and supervision of the school.

Sto. Tomas IHS is home of promising students who excel in district, unit, cluster and division-wide contests as well as regional competitions in terms of campus journalism, sports and technical skills development.

Administration
Sto. Tomas Integrated High School is administrated by a secondary school principal. The current administrator is Rhodora C. Alcantara with the rank of Principal II. There are also 37 supervisory and administrative staff and 3 job orders for academic and support services of the institution.

Administrators
Rhodora Alcantara, Principal II (June 2016 – present)
Marvin Umali, Assistant Principal II (June 2018  February 2020)

Sections
As of school year 2020–2021, the Junior High School (Grade 7 to 10) has five sections each grade level. In the Senior High School, Grade 11 has one section of ICT, one section of HE Combo 1 and one section of HE Combo 2, while Grade 12 has two sections of ICT, one section of HE Combo 1 and one section of HE Combo 2.

High schools in Laguna (province)
Educational institutions established in 2016